The Native Sound is an independent record label based in New York City. It was founded in 2013 by Julio Anta. The label has released a number of dream pop, shoegaze and folk music releases on cassette tape, limited edition vinyl, and digital download. The label's roster includes John Vanderslice, Andrew Koji Shiraki, Miserable, King Woman, Funeral Advantage, Plastic Flowers, Sheer, Drowse and Vow.

Discography

References

External links
The Native Sound on Bandcamp

American record labels
Record labels established in 2013
American independent record labels